The Daily Sun is a tabloid daily newspaper in South Africa. With a circulation of over 287,000 daily sales in 2013, it is South Africa's largest daily paper, and second only to the Sunday Times in terms of largest circulation among all papers.

History 
The Daily Sun was launched on 1 July 2002 by Media24, a division of the Naspers group. It was the brainchild of veteran journalist, Deon du Plessis, who remained its publisher and minority shareholder until 11 September 2011, when he died suddenly at his Johannesburg home.

The newspaper is based at Media Park in Auckland Park, Johannesburg, but is printed countrywide. It is now overseen by Publisher Jeremy Gordin, who took up the role in 2013.

It targets readers in and around the major urban centres. These readers are predominantly black, English-literate with high-school or further education, and working-class earners – the economic core of South Africa.

Supplements 
SunSport (Mon-Fri)
SunBuzz (Mon-Fri)
SunWheels (Mon)
SunDefender (Thu)
SunWellbeing (Thu)
SunAbility (Thu)
Lifestyle (Mon-Sun)
SunStokvel (Fri)

Distribution areas

Distribution figures

Readership figures

See also
 List of newspapers in South Africa

References

External links
 

Afrikaans-language newspapers
Afrikaner culture in Johannesburg
Daily newspapers published in South Africa
2002 establishments in South Africa
Newspapers established in 2002
Mass media in Johannesburg